Kindurangana (English: Mermaids, සිංහල: කිඳුරංගනා) is a 2007 Sri Lankan drama television series telecast on Sirasa TV on 2007. This television series was inspired by Hindi soap opera "Kasamh Se".

Plot 
This story revolves around three girls who live in Nuwara Eliya with their father. After their father's death their lives become more complicated as their father requests them to meet Prathap Gajasinghe, a millionaire businessman in Colombo.

Cast

Main
 Chamalsha Dewmini Rathnaweera as Nethra
 Yureni Noshika as Sanju
Anjalee Thathsarani as Dinu

Supporting
 Ishan Gammudali as Prathap Gajasinghe 
 Akila Sandakalum as Vihanga
 Rohani Weerasinghe as Rajini
Thushitha Weerasinghe vs Randhir
 Cybil Dharmawardana
 Edna Sugathapala
 Ananda Athukorale
 Sanjeewa Illeperuma
 Nimal Yatiwella
 Ranil Suranga
 Antonio Punchihewa
 Poornima de Silva
 Chamini Nisansala Pereira

Production
The drama was produced by Ekta Kapoor and Shobha Kapoor. This project is a co-production of Balaji Telefilms Ltd and Aquarians Entertainment Ltd. Executive producer of the drama is Frederick Dissanayake. The series was translated by Manjula Malkanthi.

References

Sri Lankan television series
Sinhala-language television
2007 Sri Lankan television series debuts
Sirasa TV original programming